Montesia is a genus of beetles in the family Cerambycidae, containing the following species:

 Montesia bosqi Seabra, 1961
 Montesia elegantula Monné, 1979
 Montesia fasciolata Galileo & Martins, 1990
 Montesia leucostigma Lane, 1938

References

Aerenicini